Ben Casselman is an American journalist. He previously worked for The Wall Street Journal, FiveThirtyEight, and is currently a business reporter for The New York Times.

Biography 
Casselman graduated from Columbia University in 2003. He started his journalism career at The Salem News before joining The Wall Street Journal, where he worked as a reporter from 2006 to 2013. He was a finalist for the 2011 Pulitzer Prize for National Reporting and shared a Gerald Loeb Award for Large Newspapers for covering the Deepwater Horizon oil spill.

In 2013, Casselman joined FiveThirtyEight as the chief economics writer and senior editor. He joined The New York Times business news desk in 2017. He was nominated for a Gerald Loeb Award for Beat Reporting in 2021 for his work on the COVID-19 pandemic's impact on the American economy.

He is an adjunct professor at the Craig Newmark Graduate School of Journalism at the City University of New York, where he teaches economic reporting.

References 

Living people

Year of birth missing (living people)
The Wall Street Journal people
The New York Times people
Gerald Loeb Award winners for Large Newspapers
City University of New York faculty
Columbia College (New York) alumni